Sean Wilson may refer to:

Sean Wilson (actor) (born 1965), English television actor
Sean Wilson (speedway rider) (born 1969), English former international speedway rider
Sean Michael Wilson, Scottish comic book writer